Eric Sturgess and Louise Brough were the defending champions, but lost in the semifinals to Mervyn Rose and Nancye Bolton.

Frank Sedgman and Doris Hart defeated Rose and Bolton in the final, 7–5, 6–3 to win the mixed doubles tennis title at the 1951 Wimbledon Championships.

Seeds

  Eric Sturgess /  Louise Brough (semifinals)
  Frank Sedgman /  Doris Hart (champions)
  Ken McGregor /  Margaret Osborne (semifinals)
  Sven Davidson /  Shirley Fry (quarterfinals)

Draw

Finals

Top half

Section 1

Section 2

Section 3

Section 4

Bottom half

Section 5

Section 6

Section 7

Section 8

References

External links

X=Mixed Doubles
Wimbledon Championship by year – Mixed doubles